Parramatta State School is located on Mulgrave Road, Paramatta Park in Cairns, Queensland, Australia. It caters for students from Prep through to Year 6. It is one of the oldest schools within the Cairns region, having opened in 1927 as State School number 639.

See also
 List of schools in Far North Queensland

External links
Parramatta State School Official website

Public schools in Queensland
Schools in Cairns
Educational institutions established in 1927
1927 establishments in Australia